
Erwin Rauch (19 October 1889 – 26 February 1969) was a German general in the Wehrmacht of Nazi Germany during World War II. He was  a recipient of the Knight's Cross of the Iron Cross. Rauch surrendered to the American troops in September 1944 after the fall of Brest.

Awards and decorations

 Knight's Cross of the Iron Cross on 22 December 1941 as Generalmajor and commander of 123. Infanterie-Division

References

Citations

Bibliography

 
 

1889 births
1969 deaths
Lieutenant generals of the German Army (Wehrmacht)
Military personnel from Berlin
German Army personnel of World War I
Prussian Army personnel
Recipients of the clasp to the Iron Cross, 1st class
Recipients of the Gold German Cross
Recipients of the Knight's Cross of the Iron Cross
German prisoners of war in World War II held by the United States
People from the Province of Brandenburg
German Army generals of World War II